Neotibicen latifasciatus, commonly called Coastal scissor grinder cicada, is a species of annual cicada in the genus Neotibicen.

See also
 Neotibicen pruinosus, the "Scissor grinder"
 Neotibicen winnemanna, the "Eastern scissor grinder"

References

Hemiptera of North America
Insects described in 1915
Cryptotympanini